Ed Argast is an American football coach and former player. He served as the head football coach at Canisius College from 2000 to 2002, compiling an overall record of 3–28 in three seasons.  His tenure at Canisius ended abruptly when the college discontinued its football team at the end of the 2002 season. Argast was the interim head football coach at Bates College in Lewiston, Maine for one season, in 2021.

Argast has served as an assistant football coach at Bates College from 1979 to 1980; Princeton University in 1981; the United States Merchant Marine Academy from 1982 to 1987; Colgate University from 1988 to 1999; Wagner College in 2003; Central Connecticut State University from 2004 to 2005; Fordham University from 2006 to 2008; Columbia University from 2009 to 2013; Bryant University from 2014 to 2016; and the University of New England from 2017 to 2019. Argast returned to Bates College in 2020 as the offensive line coach for what would have been the cancelled 2020 NCAA Division III football season, before being promoted to interim head coach at Bates for the 2021 season.

Argast graduated from Colgate University in 1978, where he played football and was a two-year starter at offensive tackle for the Colgate Raiders football team.

Head coaching record

References

External links
 
 Bates profile
 New England profile
 Bryant profile

Year of birth missing (living people)
Living people
American football offensive tackles
Bates Bobcats football coaches
Bryant Bulldogs football coaches
Canisius Golden Griffins football coaches
Central Connecticut Blue Devils football coaches
Colgate Raiders football coaches
Colgate Raiders football players
Columbia Lions football coaches
Fordham Rams football coaches
Merchant Marine Mariners football coaches
New England Nor'easters football coaches
Princeton Tigers football coaches
Wagner Seahawks football coaches